"The World Turned Upside Down" is an English ballad.

The World Turned Upside Down may also refer to:

 The World Turned Upside Down (anthology), a 2005 anthology of science fiction and fantasy short stories edited by David Drake, Eric Flint and Jim Baen
 The World Turned Upside Down (sculpture), a 2019 sculpture by Mark Wallinger
 The World Turned Upside Down, a 1972 book by the historian Christopher Hill
 The World Turned Upside Down, a 2021 book by journalist and historian Yang Jisheng
 "The World Turned Upside Down", a song by Coldplay released as the B-side to their 2005 single "Fix You"
 "The World Turned Upside Down", a 1975 song by Leon Rosselson
 "The World Turned Upside Down", a 1985 cover of the Leon Rosselson song by Billy Bragg, released on his "Between the Wars" EP
 "Yorktown (The World Turned Upside Down)", a song from the musical Hamilton (2015)

See also
 "The Day the World Turned Upside Down", a 2012 story by Thomas Olde Heuvelt
 "Diggers' Song", a 1975 song by Leon Rosselson sometimes equated with the English ballad